The Adventures of Jimmy Neutron, Boy Genius is an American CGI-animated television series. The second installment in the Jimmy Neutron franchise. It is based on the 2001 film Jimmy Neutron: Boy Genius created by John A. Davis and serves as sequel to it. It originally aired on Nickelodeon for three seasons from July 20, 2002 to November 25, 2006. The show follows an 11-year-old genius from the fictitious town of Retroville, Texas, the eponymous character, as he goes on adventures with his best friends Carl Wheezer and Sheen Estevez. Throughout the show, various mishaps and conflicts occur on these adventures, as Jimmy's various inventions go awry.  The series features voices of Debi Derryberry (Jimmy), Jeffrey Garcia (Sheen), and Rob Paulsen (Carl) for the three main characters.

Receiving mostly favorable reviews upon and since its release, the series has been the recipient of various nominations such as the Kids' Choice Award for Favorite Cartoon in 2006 and 2007, and has also won an Annie Award for "Outstanding Achievement in an Animated Television Production Produced for Children" in 2004 as well as a Motion Picture Sound Editors "Golden Reel Award". A spin-off, Planet Sheen, aired from 2010 to 2013.

Premise
The show follows a scientifically-minded boy named Jimmy Neutron from Retroville, Texas who frequently goes on adventures with his two best friends Sheen and Carl, usually involving his inventions going awry.

Characters

Series overview

The Fairly OddParents crossover episodes

There have also been three tie-ins with special episode crossovers involving the Nickelodeon hand-drawn style series The Fairly OddParents under the title "The Jimmy Timmy Power Hour" (the first alone, the second and third with the subtitles "When Nerds Collide!" and "The Jerkinators!," respectively); the five main characters from Jimmy Neutron meet with the main characters from The Fairly OddParents, Timmy, his godparents, and his two best friends Chester, and AJ, and often cross between each of their worlds of 2-D and 3-D animation.

Production

Development
Keith Alcorn and John A. Davis created Jimmy (then named Johnny Quasar) sometime during the 1980s and wrote a script titled Runaway Rocketboy (later the name of the pilot), which was abandoned. He later stumbled upon the idea while moving into a new house in the early 1990s. Davis re-worked it as a short film titled Johnny Quasar and presented it at SIGGRAPH, where he met Steve Oedekerk and worked on a television series of the short as well as the movie. Jimmy was still called Johnny Quasar before it was decided to name him Jimmy Neutron because the name sounded eerily similar to Jonny Quest.
The pilot involves Jimmy Neutron testing a rocket ship that he has invented, and later uses it when he inadvertently stumbles upon a Yolkian plot to conquer Earth. The pilot was aired in short mini-episodes on Nickelodeon before the film's release, and its plot was used for the film. It was later included as an extra on the "Confusion Fusion" and "The Complete Series" DVDs. It was originally supposed to air as a short on KaBlam!, but the show got canceled before the episode aired. 

The pilot had a few differences from the main series. In it, Jimmy wore a red and white stripped shirt and did not wear his signature red atom shirt, Judy's hair was darker, Hugh wore a blue suit (insted of a sweater vest and tie) and was a bit smarter, the Yolkians all wore grey suits and King Goobot's crown was a different color, the theme song was longer with a few lines that were cut later, Goddard was voiced by Kim Saxon, instead of Frank Welker, Carl Wheezer resembled his father, Sheen Estevez, Cindy Vortex, and Libby Folfax were absent and the title card had a picture in the scene.

Writing
The main writers when the show was greenlit were Steven Banks and Jed Spingarn.

Animation
DNA Productions retooled their pipeline when moving from the film to the TV series, to reuse assets for the episodes. Some of the programming team at the studio programmed a special code that allowed the animators to animate scenes in Maya, which can then be rendered in Lightwave. This helped the team keep up with the deadline and avoid going over budget.

Possible reboot/revival plans
In 2016, director John A. Davis has stated that he has a story for a Jimmy Neutron reboot feature that he would like to make, but he is waiting for the "right situation" to make it.

When asked about a reboot in 2020, Rob Paulsen stated "Well, I've got to tell you, man. I go all over the world when we don't have the coronavirus, and people love Carl. They love Carl. I don't think it would be a bad thing at all to reboot Jimmy Neutron. I think that's one of those shows that a lot of people would love to see again. It was very good. Really smart. That wouldn't surprise me."

Theme song
The theme song was originally written by Brian Causey for the pilot episode. Pop-punk band Bowling for Soup later revamped and extended Causey's theme for the film version theme. Ultimately, the original theme was kept for the TV series intro and outro.

Reception

Critical reception 
Joly Herman of Common Sense Media gave the series 3 out of 5 stars; saying that, "Jimmy Neutron has all the trappings of a Nickelodeon show: the preteen peer pressure, the gadgets, the spacey parents. But it's clever enough and funny enough to have earned a devoted following. The script is generally well written and well executed -- the adults behind this show approach the project with apparent zeal. [...] Kids will enjoy this program, while parents might get a kick out of some of the gags as well. And though the computer animation may seem a bit freaky for old-school animation fans, it does allow for quality special effects."

Awards and nominations

Home media

DVD releases

Spin-off 

A spin-off series, Planet Sheen, aired from 2010 to 2013. The show focuses on Sheen Estevez, who accidentally crash-lands on the planet Zeenu in the pilot episode.

See also
Jimmy Neutron: Boy Genius
Planet Sheen

References

External links

 
The Adventures of Jimmy Neutron, Boy Genius at Don Markstein's Toonopedia. Archived from the original on August 31, 2015.

2002 American television series debuts
2006 American television series endings
2000s American animated television series
2000s American comic science fiction television series
2000s American time travel television series
2000s Nickelodeon original programming
 
Alien invasions in television
American children's animated adventure television series
American children's animated comic science fiction television series
American computer-animated television series
American sequel television series
Animated television shows based on films
Animated television series about children
Annie Award winners
Computer-animated television series
DNA Productions television series
Elementary school television series
English-language television shows
Television series about geniuses
Television series about size change
Television shows set in Texas